The Olivia Business Centre a business park situated in the Oliwa district of Gdańsk, along Grunwaldzka Avenue. The construction project has been divided into stages, with five buildings erected so far (August 2016)

The first building completed, Olivia Gate, has an area of 18,000 m² and an underground garage  for 420 cars. Olivia Point (9,600 m²) came next, followed by  Olivia Tower (14,200 m²). In March 2014, Olivia Four (14,500 m²) was completed . With the next building – Olivia Six (ca. 17,000 m² of leasable area  – ref>launched in May ref>2015, the complex became Poland’s second largest office park 

In April 2015, the project entered the next stage: the construction of Olivia Star – the tallest building in Northern Poland, with the year-round winter garden for residents. Olivia Star will be located between Olivia Four and Olivia Six, thereby closing the ring around the inner, publicly accessible patio with greenery and water features. At this stage, the Olivia Business Centre’s leasable floor area will increase from 73,000 sq m to 120,000 sq m. The first tenants are expected to move in at the beginning of 2017 

Olivia Business Centre is developed by Maciej Grabski – the co-founder of Wirtualna Polska (the first web portal in Poland). The buildings are constructed by Pekabex. The overall architectural concept of the complex was prepared by Konior and Partners Architects. The design work is continued by BJK Architekci, an architectural firm based in Gdynia, responsible for the entirety of the Olivia Six and Olivia Star design 

The 3.5 hectare land site can accommodate up to 12 modern, environment-friendly office buildings.

Events and services 
Olivia Business Centre Business is host of many educational, cultural and sports events. In 2015 alone, almost 300 events for entrepreneurs from the region of Pomerania were held here, including e.g. InfoShare and Startup Sauna. OBC residents are frequently visited by science, sports and art celebrities. Furthermore, Olivia Sky Club hosted meetings dedicated to development of the Gdańsk-Gdynia-Sopot Metropolitan Area strategy and a gala of “Holiday Internship” – a programme with almost 90 participants 

Employees and experts from companies based at Olivia Business Centre share their knowledge and experience with students during presentations and lectures held at the nearby University of Gdańsk, as well as during hands-on activities on the office park premises. Events organised for the local community include Children’s Day family picnics, “Drop of Energy” blood donation campaigns and Christmas markets.

Olivia Business Centre promotes sports activities of the resident community, too. Representatives of OBC-based companies may try their hand at corporate football, volleyball and tennis leagues. Furthermore, the Centre is engaged in running events: Poland Business Run and Oliwa Run.

Olivia Business Centre supports various initiatives aimed at promotion of the city and the region. The “Choose Gdańsk” campaign encourages people of different age groups to start or continue their professional career in the city.

Amenities for residents include 3 conference centres, a medical centre with a pharmacy, 3 restaurants, a Starbucks coffee shop, a day nursery and a nursery school, 4 banks, a modern gymnasium, a beauty salon, a notary’s office and an electric vehicle charging station. The Centre provides open air and underground parking facilities for over 2000 cars, 300 bicycle racks and 5 changing rooms with showers

Surroundings 
Facilities to be found in the vicinity include the Hala Olivia arena in the immediate neighbourhood, Arkońska Business Park (ca. 26 500 m² ), the Alchemia building (ca. 21,500 m² of rentable office space), the University of Gdańsk campus, the Familia shopping centre and the SKM Gdańsk Przymorze-Uniwersytet railway station.

References

Business parks
Gdańsk